Alejandro Fabian Farías (born 27 January 1970, in Argentina) is an Argentine retired footballer.

Career

Farías started his career with Boca Juniors, one of Argentina's most successful club, leaving due to injury. After that, he played in the American top flight with New England Revolution as well as the Argentine second division with Club Atlético Atlanta, Club Almagro, Club Atlético Nueva Chicago, and Defensores de Belgrano.

References

External links
 

Argentine footballers
Living people
Association football midfielders
1970 births
Boca Juniors footballers
Club Atlético Atlanta footballers
New England Revolution players
Club Almagro players
Defensores de Belgrano footballers
Footballers from Buenos Aires
Major League Soccer players